The Vilayet of Adrianople or Vilayet of Edirne (Vilâyet-i Edirne) was a first-level administrative division (vilayet) of the Ottoman Empire.

This vilayet was split between Turkey and Greece in 1923, culminating in the formation of Western and Eastern Thrace after World War I as part of the Treaty of Lausanne. A small portion of the Vilayet was given to Bulgaria in the Treaty of Bucharest (1913) after the Balkan wars. In the east it bordered with the Istanbul Vilayet, the Black Sea and the Sea of Marmara, in the west with the Salonica Vilayet, in the north with Eastern Rumelia (Bulgaria since 1885) and in the south with the Aegean Sea. Sometimes the area is described also as Southern Thrace, or Adrianopolitan Thrace.

After the city of Adrianople (Edirne in Turkish; pop. in 1905 about 80,000), the principal towns were Rodosto (now Tekirdağ) (35,000), Gelibolu (25,000), Kırklareli (16,000), İskeçe (14,000), Çorlu (11,500), Dimetoka (10,000), Enez (8000), Gümülcine (8000) and Dedeağaç (3000).

Administrative divisions
Sanjaks of the Vilayet:
 Sanjak of Adrianople (now Edirne) (Adrianople, Cisr-i Mustafapaşa, Kırcaali, Dimetoka, Ortaköy, Cisr-i Ergene, Havsa. It had also kazas of Kırkkilise, Baba-yı Atik, Beykar Hisar, Maa Hatunili-Kızılağaç (Its centre was Kızılağaç) and Ferecik. Kızılağaç went to Yanbolu sanjak of Şarki Rumeli Vilayeti, Ferecik went initially to Gelibolu in 1876, later to Dedeağaç and was demoted to nahiya in 1878, Kırkkilise, Baba-yı Atik and Beykar Hisar went to recreated Kırkkilise sanjak in 1878. Beykar Hisar was demoted to nahiya in 1879)
 Sanjak of Kirklareli (Since 1878) (Kirkkilise) (Kırkkilise, Tırnovacık, Lüleburgaz, Vize, Ahtabolu, Midye, Baba-yı Atik. Most of Tırnovacık and Ahtabolu were ceded to Bulgaria in 1913. Saray separated from Vize and became kaza in 1916)
 Sanjak of Rodosto (now Tekirdağ) (Tekfurdagi) (Tekfurdağı, Çorlu, Malkara, Hayrabolu. It had also kazas Vize, Lüleburgaz and Midye till 1879, it was gone to recreated Kırkkilise sanjak)
 Sanjak of Gelibolu (Gelibolu, Maydos, Şarköy, Mürefte, Keşan. It had also Enez and Gümülcine kazas till 1878. Gümülcine promoted to sanjak in 1878. Enez went to Dedeağaç sanjak. Finally İpsala (promoted to kaza) and Enez returned to Gelibolu in 1913)
 Sanjak of Dedeağaç (1878-1912) (Dedeağaç, Sofulu, Enez)
 Sanjak of Gümülcine (1878-1912) (Gümülcine, İskeçe, Koşukavak, Ahiçelebi, Eğridere, Darıdere). The whole Sanjak was ceded to Bulgaria, with a small part to Greece in 1913.
 Sanjak of Filibe (Filibe, Pazarcık, Hasköy, Zağra-i Atik, Kızanlık, Çırpan, Sultanyeri, Ahiçelebi) (until 1878, then it became part of Eastern Rumelia)
 Sanjak of Slimia (İslimye, Yanbolu, Misivri, Karinabat, Aydos, Zağra-i Cedid, Ahyolu, Burgaz) (until 1878, then became part of Eastern Rumelia)

Demographics

Total population of the Adrianople Vilayet (including Eastern Rumelia) in 1878 according to the Turkish author Kemal Karpat:

Population of the groups of the Vilayet and Sanjaks according to the Ottoman census in 1906/7, in thousands, adjusted to round numbers.
The groups are counted according to the Millet System of the Ottoman Empire not according to the mother tongue, some Bulgarian-speakers were part of the Greek Rum millet and counted as Greeks, while the Muslim millet included Turks and Pomaks (Bulgarian speaking Muslims).

A publication from December 21, 1912, in the Belgian magazine Ons Volk Ontwaakt (Our Nation Awakes) estimated 1,006,500 inhabitants: 
Muslim Turks – 250,000
Muslim Bulgarians – 115,000
Muslim Roma people – 15,000
Orthodox Armenians – 30,000
Orthodox Greeks – 220,000
Orthodox Bulgarians – 370,000
Orthodox Albanians – 3,500
Orthodox Turks – 3,000

Sanjak of Filibe
Male population of the Filibe Sanjak of the Adrianople Vilayet in 1876  according to the British R. J. Moore:

Sanjak of İslimiye
Male population of İslimiye sanjak of Adrianople Vilayet in 1873 according to Ottoman almanacs:

Male population of İslimiye sanjak of Adrianople Vilayet in 1875 according to British R.J. Moore:

Sanjak of Gümülcine

Total population of the Sanjak of Gümülcine of the Adrianople Vilayet In the 19th century:

Gallery

References

External links

 
Vilayets of the Ottoman Empire in Europe
History of Western Thrace
History of Çanakkale Province
History of Edirne Province
History of Kırklareli Province
History of Tekirdağ Province
1867 establishments in the Ottoman Empire
Ottoman period in the history of Bulgaria
Ottoman Thrace
1922 disestablishments in the Ottoman Empire